Rabah Khaloufi (17 January 1943 – 19 May 2014) was a French boxer. He competed in the men's flyweight event at the 1972 Summer Olympics. At the 1972 Summer Olympics, he lost to Maurice O'Sullivan of Great Britain.

References

External links
 

1943 births
2014 deaths
French male boxers
Olympic boxers of France
Boxers at the 1972 Summer Olympics
Sportspeople from Algiers
Flyweight boxers